Otjikondo is a settlement with post office, shops and hotel, 83 km north-west of Outjo in Namibia. The name is from the Herero language and means 'place of the kondo-coloured cattle', i.e. red or black with a strip of white across the back.

References

Populated places in the Kunene Region